Brandon Jones is the name of:

 Brandon Jones (actor) (born 1988), American actor
 Brandon Jones (politician), Representative of Mississippi's 111th District
 Brandon Jones (singer) (born 1989),  Canadian singer/songwriter, 2006 Canadian Idol competitor
 Brandon Astor Jones (1943–2016), American convicted murderer
 Brandon Jones, co-founder of GameTrailers

Sportspeople
 Brandon Jones (athlete) (born 1987), Belizean-American track and field athlete
 Brandon Jones (baseball) (born 1983), American baseball player
 Brandon Jones (wide receiver) (born 1982), American football wide receiver
 Brandon Jones (cornerback) (born 1989), American football cornerback
 Brandon Jones (safety) (born 1998), American football safety
 Brandon Jones (racing driver) (born 1997), American race car driver in NASCAR

See also 
 Brendan Jones (disambiguation)
 Brenden Jones (born 1974), American politician